Peltastisis is a genus of deep-sea bamboo coral in the family Isididae. There are two species recognized:
Peltastisis cornuta Nutting, 1910
Peltastisis uniserialis Nutting, 1910

References

Isididae
Octocorallia genera